Two ships of the Ministry of War Transport carried the name Empire Condor.

Ship names